Prince Karol Stanisław Radziwiłł (1669–1719) was a Polish-Lithuanian nobleman and diplomat.

Ordynat of Nieśwież, Stolnik of Lithuania in 1685, Equerry of Lithuania in 1686, Deputy Chancellor of Lithuania in 1690, Grand Chancellor of Lithuania in 1698, Bailiff of Vilnius.

He married Anna Katarzyna Sanguszko on March 6, 1691 in Vilnius. He was awarded the Order of the White Eagle.

Secular senators of the Polish–Lithuanian Commonwealth
1669 births
1719 deaths
Karol Stanislaw
Grand Chancellors of the Grand Duchy of Lithuania